The 1997 Copa dos Campeões Mundiais was the third edition of the Copa dos Campeões Mundiais. Flamengo has won their first title.

Participants

First stage

Standings

Final

Champion

References  

1997 in Brazilian football
Copa dos Campeões Mundiais